Harold Davis (May 12, 1934 – December 9, 2007) was an American college football and basketball player at Westminster College, Pennsylvania. A quarterback who could run as well as throw, he was inducted into the College Football Hall of Fame in 2004.

Davis was one of four men from Westminster inducted the College Football Hall of Fame. He was a standout quarterback for the Titans from 1953 to 1956 and became the only three-time, first-team All-America football player in school history. Davis, who played quarterback under Hall of Fame head coach Harold Burry during a time when African-Americans rarely played the position, led Westminster to an overall record of 28–1–1 (.950), including the first undefeated seasons in school history in 1953 (8–0), 1955 (6–0–1) and 1956 (8–0). He was drafted by the Philadelphia Eagles of the National Football League.

Davis was a native of Youngstown, Ohio and also lettered in basketball and track and field at Westminster.  He graduated in 1957 with a degree in economics, served in the United States Army, and worked for the Youngstown City School District and the Xerox Corporation.  He lived in Bloomfield Hills, Michigan, where he died in December 2007 of cancer.

External links
From Westminster College Athletics Web Site: Harold Davis Passes Away at 73 
 Reprint of obituary from New Castle, PA News
News from College Football Hall of Fame

1934 births
2007 deaths
Basketball players from Youngstown, Ohio
Westminster College (Pennsylvania) alumni
American football quarterbacks
College Football Hall of Fame inductees
Deaths from cancer in Michigan
Players of American football from Youngstown, Ohio